Charles William Gittins (born October 26, 1956) is an American lawyer, who has worked for a number of noteworthy defendants in military courts martial.

Gittins attended the United States Naval Academy, graduating in 1979. He then joined the Marine Corps where he served as a Radar Intercept Officer.

Gittins graduated first in his class from The Catholic University of America's Columbus School of Law in 1987 and was in the Judge Advocate Corps for six years, before entering civilian life.
The first civilian firm Gittins worked for was Williams & Connolly. While there he defended Robert E. Stumpf, Commander of the Blue Angels, and one of the principals in the Tailhook scandal.
He spent three and a half years there before founding his own firm.

Clients

See also

References

Living people
United States Marine Corps officers
1956 births
Columbus School of Law alumni